Didarganj is a constituency of the Uttar Pradesh Legislative Assembly covering the city of Didarganj in the Azamgarh district of Uttar Pradesh, India.

Didarganj is one of five assembly constituencies in the Lalganj Lok Sabha constituency. Since 2008, this assembly constituency is numbered 350 amongst 403 constituencies.

Election results

2022

2017
Bahujan Samaj Party candidate Sukhdev Rajbhar won in last Assembly election of 2017 Uttar Pradesh Legislative Elections defeating Samajwadi Party candidate Adil Sheikh by a margin of 3,645 votes.

Members of Legislative Assembly

References

External links
 

Assembly constituencies of Uttar Pradesh
Politics of Azamgarh district